Flying Saucer Rock'n'Roll, is a 12-minute spoof of a 1950s black and white science fiction B-movie. It was first released in 1997 and stars Ardal O'Hanlon, Joe Rooney and Tara Costello.  It was written by Mik Duffy and its director Enda Hughes.

The title is taken from the 1957 rockabilly novelty hit record "Flyin' Saucers Rock & Roll" by Billy Lee Riley and His Little Green Men. O'Hanlan's "rendition" of the song, is performed by producer Michael Hughes.

Director of Photography Seamus McGarvey went on to establish himself as a world-renowned cinematographer. Notable credits include High Fidelity (2000), The Name of This Film is Dogme95 (2000), Atonement (2007), Avengers Assemble (2012) and Godzilla (2014).

Plot 

A likeable movie-loving loser discovers and thwarts an alien kidnap plan, due to a hearing impairment that renders him immune to the alien's hypnotic sound ray.

References 

 The Film in full on the Northern Ireland Screen Digital Film Archive

1997 short films
1997 films
1990s musical comedy films
1990s science fiction comedy films
Irish black-and-white films
Films about extraterrestrial life
Irish musical comedy films
1997 comedy films
Irish science fiction comedy films
English-language Irish films